Fire, the acoustic album is the eighth studio album by former Guns N' Roses guitarist Izzy Stradlin, originally released only on iTunes in 2007. The album is mainly acoustic-driven, with country, folk and blues roots.

Background
The album was recorded in California during the Summer of 2007, with very basic production. The album was mixed in Dallas at Nomad Studios, and mastered by Gary Long. Izzy Stradlin co-wrote two songs ("Box and "Seems to Me") with UK-based musician Timo Kaltio. Izzy first informed Will Vilers (his website administrator) about the album on November 5, 2007, with an e-mail simply titled "Fire, the Acoustic Album." The album's full track listing was later revealed on Izzy's website, directly in conjunction with the album's release on iTunes.

Track listing
All lyrics and music by Izzy Stradlin, except where noted.
"I Don't Mind" - 3:39
"Infrastruk" - 3:24
"Listen" - 3:17
"Airbus" - 3:29
"Fire" - 3:47
"Seems to Me" (Stradlin, Timo Kaltio) - 3:30
"Long Night" - 3:15
"Box" (Stradlin, Kaltio) - 4:20
"Milo" - 3:30
"Harp Song" - 3:03

Personnel
Izzy Stradlin - vocals, rhythm guitar
Rick Richards - lead guitar
JT Longoria - bass guitar
Taz Bentley - drums

References 

2007 albums
Izzy Stradlin albums